Torlino Vimercati is a comune (municipality) in the Province of Cremona in the Italian region Lombardy, located about  east of Milan and about  northwest of Cremona.

Torlino Vimercati borders the following municipalities: Agnadello, Capralba, Palazzo Pignano, Pieranica, Quintano, Trescore Cremasco, Vailate.

References

Cities and towns in Lombardy